Little League Baseball has been played in Canada since 1951. Cape Breton, Nova Scotia and Vancouver, British Columbia were the first leagues outside the United States. Approximately 500 leagues now operate in Canada, making it the second-largest country in Little League participation. In 1952, Montreal, Quebec was the first foreign entry in the Little League World Series.  In 1953, Little Mountain Little League of Vancouver advanced to the World Series as representative of the Western Region.  In 1958, Canada was given an automatic berth in the LLWS and have since participated in every tournament, with the exception of 1975.  Until 1965, the Canadian region consisted of only teams from Ontario and Quebec.  Prior to 1966, the western provinces participated in tournament play with American teams in the original West Region, while the Maritime provinces were excluded.  In 1965, Canada began play as a full region.

Canada has never won the series, but in 1965 Stoney Creek Optimist Little League of Ontario reached the final.  Valleyfield Little League (Salaberry-de-Valleyfield) is the league with the most championships (8); the Whalley LL of Surrey, British Columbia has six; and Glace Bay LL and Trail are third with five.

Regions
The Prairie Provinces Division has been replaced by two provincial championship tournaments—in Alberta and Saskatchewan. The Atlantic Provinces Division continues to have a divisional championship.

Canadian Championships

Finals

Leagues with most titles

By province

Canada in the LLWS

Participations

LLWS by province
Note: The statistics below are through the 2022 Little League World Series.

Of the provinces in which Little League–affiliated leagues operate, New Brunswick is the only one yet to be represented in the LLWS. The provinces of Manitoba, Newfoundland and Labrador, and Prince Edward Island do not have any leagues affiliated with Little League Baseball; the same holds true for Canada's three territories.

See also

Canada Region in other Little League divisions
Intermediate League World Series (Canada Region)
Junior League World Series (Canada Region)
Senior League World Series (Canada Region)
Big League World Series (Canada Region)

References

Canada
Baseball leagues in Canada
Baseball competitions in Canada
Recurring sporting events established in 1958